State Route 852 (SR 852) is a north–south state highway in the southern portion of the U.S. state of Ohio.

Route description
SR 852 begins on the Carl Perkins Memorial Bridge over the Ohio River. The route heads north as a two-lane highway, passing through farmland and woodland. The highway passes the Portsmouth Raceway Park and has an interchange with U.S. Route 52 (US 52), US 23 Truck, SR 73 east, and SR 104 south. The road has a traffic light at an access road from northbound SR 73 and SR 104. SR 852 ends at a partial interchange with SR 73 and SR 104.

The only section of SR 852 that is included as a part of the National Highway System (NHS), is that from the Kentucky state line north to the interchange with US 52. The NHS is a system of routes determined to be the most important for the nation's economy, mobility and defense. The highway is maintained by the Ohio Department of Transportation (ODOT) like all other state routes in the state. The department tracks the traffic volumes along all state highways as a part of its maintenance responsibilities using a metric called average annual daily traffic (AADT). This measurement is a calculation of the traffic level along a segment of roadway for any average day of the year. In 2011, ODOT figured that the lowest traffic levels were present on the section between the Kentucky state line and the interchange with US 52, where only 5,240 vehicles used the highway daily. The peak traffic volume was 12,730 vehicles AADT along a section of SR 852 on the bridge over US 52

Major intersections

References

External links
State Route 852 Endpoint Photos

852
Transportation in Scioto County, Ohio
State highways in the United States shorter than one mile